Daniel Monberg Jensen (born 25 June 1979) is a Danish former professional footballer. A central midfielder, he was known for making good passes in the final third of the field. He played more than 50 matches and scored three goals for the Denmark national team, and represented his country at the 2004 European Championship. He is the younger brother of a retired former Denmark international player Niclas Jensen.

Club career

Early career
Born in Copenhagen, Daniel Jensen started playing football at B93 in the secondary Danish 1st Division. In his time at the club he made 44 appearances scoring 9 goals. He was called up for Danish under-19 national team in September 1995, and made his senior debut for Boldklubben in the fall 1996. He played a total 16 matches and scored three goals for the under-19 national team, before he was sold to Dutch club Heerenveen in July 1998.

Heerenveen
While at Heerenveen, he played 19 games and scored two goals for the Danish under-21 national team. In February 2002, he made his Danish national team debut under national coach Morten Olsen.

After more than 100 league matches for Heerenveen, his contract ran out in the summer 2003, and he left the club on a free transfer.

Murcia
Jensen sought a move to a club in the La Liga championship, and signed a one-year contract with newly promoted team Real Murcia in August 2003. Murcia ended last in the 2003–04 La Liga season, and Jensen was reported on his way to a number of German clubs. He was called up to the Danish team for the 2004 European Championship (Euro 2004) in June 2004. He began the Euro 2004 tournament as a part of the Danish starting line-up, and played full-time in the first two matches against Italy and Bulgaria. He was replaced by Christian Poulsen during Denmark's third match, and saw the quarter-final defeat to the Czech Republic from the bench. Back from Euro 2004, Murcia used a clause in Jensen's contract to prolong it for another two years. The extension hindered Jensen from leaving the club on a free transfer, and he was sold to German club Werder Bremen for €1 million in July 2004.

Werder Bremen
In August 2006, he was a part of the German League Cup winning Werder Bremen team. In January 2008, Jensen signed an extension to his contract with Werder Bremen, that would keep him at the club until 2011.

On 11 May 2011, Jensen was released from his contract a month early due to comments made about the coaching staff after being left out of the squad against Borussia Dortmund. "There was a discussion between him and coach Thomas Schaaf this morning and he has been released with immediate effect," sports director Klaus Allofs said in a statement, "He does not play any role in our planning any more."

Later career
In December 2011, he joined Italian Serie A club Novara on trial, in an attempt to get a new contract. In January 2012, Jensen signed a contract with Novara that kept him at the club until 2013.

Personal life
Jensen's older brother Niclas was also a professional footballer. Like Daniel, Niclas also represented Denmark at international level and played in the Bundesliga.

Career statistics

Club

International
Scores and results list Denmark's goal tally first, score column indicates score after each Jensen goal.

Honours
Werder Bremen
DFB-Ligapokal: 2006
DFB-Pokal: 2008–09

Copenhagen
Danish Superliga: 2012–13

References

External links
 
 
 

1979 births
Living people
Danish men's footballers
Association football midfielders
Denmark international footballers
Denmark youth international footballers
Denmark under-21 international footballers
UEFA Euro 2004 players
2010 FIFA World Cup players
Boldklubben af 1893 players
SC Heerenveen players
Real Murcia players
SV Werder Bremen players
Novara F.C. players
F.C. Copenhagen players
SønderjyskE Fodbold players
Lyngby Boldklub players
La Liga players
Bundesliga players
Eredivisie players
Serie A players
Serie B players
Danish Superliga players
Danish expatriate sportspeople in the Netherlands
Expatriate footballers in the Netherlands
Danish expatriate sportspeople in Spain
Expatriate footballers in Spain
Danish expatriate sportspeople in Germany
Expatriate footballers in Germany
Danish expatriate sportspeople in Italy
Expatriate footballers in Italy
Footballers from Copenhagen